Ángel Gallardo may refer to:
Ángel Gallardo (civil engineer) (1867–1934), Argentine civil engineer, natural scientist, and politician
Ángel Gallardo (golfer) (born 1943), Spanish golfer
Ángel Ballesteros Gallardo (born 1940), Spanish poet and historian
Ángel Gallardo (Buenos Aires Underground), a railway station in Argentina